The Journey is a smooth jazz studio album by Earl Klugh released in 1997. The album stayed on the Billboard Top Contemporary Jazz Albums charts for several weeks at No 6. This was the final album that Klugh recorded for Warner Bros. Records.

Track listing 
All tracks composed by Earl Klugh
"All Through the Night" - 5:13
"Last Song" - 4:28
"4 Minute Samba" - 3:58
"Sneakin' Out of Here" - 5:05
"The Journey" - 6:10
"Good as It Gets" - 4:18
"Fingerdance" - 5:53
"Evil Eye" - 6:19
"Walk in the Sun" - 3:58
"Autumn Song" - 6:07

Personnel
Earl Klugh - guitar, keyboards
Paul M. Jackson, Jr. - electric guitar
Al Turner - bass
Greg Phillinganes, David Spradley, Luis Resto, Albert Duncan - keyboards
Ray Manzerolle - synth wind
Ron Otis, Harvey Mason - drums
Paulinho da Costa - percussion
Lenny Price - saxophone
Johnny Mandel - orchestral arrangements, conductor

Charts

References 

1997 albums
Earl Klugh albums
Albums arranged by Johnny Mandel
Warner Records albums